There are several large valleys that have been given names on the surface of the Moon. These are listed below. Most of these valleys are named after a nearby crater; see the list of craters on the Moon for more information.

See also

 List of craters on the Moon
 List of features on the Moon
 List of maria on the Moon
 List of mountains on the Moon

External links
 Digital Lunar Orbiter Photographic Atlas of the Moon
 USGS: Moon nomenclature
 USGS: Moon Nomenclature: Valleys

 
Moon
Moon-related lists